1996 in Russian football returned the fifth national title to Spartak Moscow, while the Russian Cup was taken by Lokomotiv Moscow.

Club competitions

FC Spartak Moscow won the title for the fourth time.

For more details, see:
1996 Russian Top League
1996 Russian First League
1996 Russian Second League
1996 Russian Third League

Cup competitions
The fourth edition of the Russian Cup, 1995–96 Russian Cup was won by FC Lokomotiv Moscow, who beat FC Spartak Moscow in the finals with a score of 3-2.

Early stages of the 1996–97 Russian Cup were played later in the year.

European club competitions

1995–96 UEFA Champions League

FC Spartak Moscow was knocked out in the quarterfinals.

Several key players (Stanislav Cherchesov, Viktor Onopko, Vasili Kulkov and Sergei Yuran) who played in the group stage where Spartak did not lose a single point left the club to move to Western European clubs in the winter before the quarterfinals.

Nicolas Ouédec was instrumental again, after scoring 7 goals in 4 games against the Russian teams in the 1994–95 UEFA Cup, this time he scored 3 goals in two games against Spartak.

 March 6, 1996 / Quarterfinals, First Leg / FC Nantes - FC Spartak Moscow 2-0 (N'Doram  Ouédec  Pedros  ) / Nantes, Stade de la Beaujoire / Attendance: 32,500
FC Spartak Moscow: Nigmatullin, Lipko, Nikiforov, Tsymbalar (Shmarov, 46), Mamedov (Chudin, 35), Ananko, Piatnitski (captain), Alenichev (Bezrodny, 72), Evseev, Kechinov, Tikhonov.

 March 20, 1996 / Quarterfinals, Return Leg / FC Spartak Moscow - FC Nantes 2-2 (Nikiforov   - Ouédec  ) / Moscow, Lokomotiv Stadium / Attendance: 22,000
FC Spartak Moscow: Nigmatullin, Ananko, Nikiforov (captain), Tsymbalar, Evseev, Lipko, Serhiy Nahornyak (Bezrodny, 75), Alenichev, Shmarov (Piatnitski, 60), Kechinov, Tikhonov.

1995–96 UEFA Cup Winners' Cup
FC Dynamo Moscow were eliminated in the quarterfinals.

 March 7, 1996 / FC Dynamo Moscow - SK Rapid Wien 0-1 (Stumpf ) / Moscow, Lokomotiv Stadium / Attendance: 8,300
FC Dynamo Moscow: Smetanin (captain), Yakhimovich, Kovtun, Shulgin (Kutsenko, 63), Nekrasov, Kobelev, Samatov, Cheryshev (Tishkov, 40), Safronov (A. Grishin, 39), Kuznetsov, Teryokhin.
 March 21, 1996 / SK Rapid Wien - FC Dynamo Moscow 3-0 (Jancker   Stöger  - Cheryshev  Teryokhin ) / Vienna, Ernst-Happel-Stadion / Attendance: 44,000
FC Dynamo Moscow: Smetanin (captain), Yakhimovich, Kovtun, Shulgin (Safronov, 59), Nekrasov, Kobelev, Samatov (Lemeshko, 65), Cheryshev, A. Grishin (Tishkov, 56), Podpaly, Teryokhin.

1995–96 UEFA Cup
All the Russian teams were eliminated in 1995.

1996–97 UEFA Champions League

FC Alania Vladikavkaz was knocked out in the qualifying round.

 August 7, 1996 / Qualifying Round, First Leg / Rangers F.C. - FC Alania Vladikavkaz 3-1 (McInnes  McCoist  Petrić  - Yanovskiy ) Yanovskiy missed the goal from a penalty kick in the 81st minute / Glasgow, Ibrox Stadium / Attendance: 42,000
FC Alania Vladikavkaz: Kramarenko, Revishvili (Botsiyev, 40), Pagayev, Kornienko, I. Dzhioyev (captain), Tetradze, Tedeyev, Yanovskiy, Qosimov (Skysh, 65), Agayev, Suleymanov (Sergeyev, 77).

 August 21, 1996 / Qualifying Round, Return Leg / FC Alania Vladikavkaz - Rangers F.C. 2-7 (Yanovskiy  Suleymanov  - McCoist    van Vossen  Laudrup   Miller ) / Vladikavkaz, Republican Spartak Stadium / Attendance: 37,000
FC Alania Vladikavkaz: Khapov, Revishvili, Timofeev, Shelia, I. Dzhioyev (captain), Tetradze, Tedeyev (Agayev, 28, Sergeyev, 57), Yanovskiy, Kornienko (Skysh, 79), Kanishchev, Suleymanov.

1996–97 UEFA Cup Winners' Cup

FC Lokomotiv Moscow went out in the second round.

 September 12, 1996 / First round, first leg / FC Lokomotiv Moscow – NK Varteks 1–0 (Cherevchenko ) / Moscow, Lokomotiv Stadium / Attendance: 1,500
FC Lokomotiv Moscow: Ovchinnikov, Cherevchenko (Arifullin, 86), Drozdov, Kharlachyov, Pashinin, Chugainov, Kosolapov (captain), Gurenko, Janashia, Elyshev, Garin (Snigiryov, 55, Maminov, 73).

 September 26, 1996 / First round, second leg / NK Varteks – FC Lokomotiv Moscow 2–1 (Vugrinec   – Kosolapov ) / Varaždin, Stadion Varteks / Attendance: 3,000
FC Lokomotiv Moscow: Ovchinnikov, Cherevchenko, Pashinin, Solomatin, Hovhannisyan, Chugainov, Kosolapov (captain), Gurenko, Janashia (Snigiryov, 80), Maminov (Drozdov, 86), Haras (Elyshev, 63).

 October 17, 1996 / Second round, first leg / S.L. Benfica – FC Lokomotiv Moscow 1–0 (João Pinto ) / Lisbon, Estádio da Luz / Attendance: 10,000
FC Lokomotiv Moscow: Ovchinnikov, Cherevchenko, Drozdov, Kharlachyov, Hovhannisyan, Chugainov, Kosolapov (captain), Gurenko, Pashinin, Maminov (Smirnov, 59), Haras (Veselov, 70).

 October 31, 1996 / Second round, second leg / FC Lokomotiv Moscow – S.L. Benfica 2–3 (Solomatin  Haras  – Panduru  Donizete  João Pinto ) / Moscow, Lokomotiv Stadium / Attendance: 7,000
FC Lokomotiv Moscow: Ovchinnikov, Cherevchenko, Drozdov, Kharlachyov, Pashinin, Chugainov, Kosolapov (captain), Gurenko, Solomatin, Maminov, Haras (Veselov, 76).

1996–97 UEFA Cup

PFC CSKA Moscow, FC Dynamo Moscow and FC Torpedo-Luzhniki Moscow were eliminated in the first round after going through the qualifying round. FC Alania Vladikavkaz went out in the first round after going to the UEFA Cup after failing in the qualification for the Champions League. FC Spartak Moscow went out in the second round.

 August 6, 1996 / Qualifying Round, First Leg / ÍA - PFC CSKA Moscow 0-2 (Karsakov  Jankauskas ) / Akranes, Akranesvöllur / Attendance: 1,100
PFC CSKA Moscow: Tyapushkin, Shutov (Ulyanov, 46), Khokhlov, Mashkarin, Samaroni, Bushmanov, Semak (captain), Karsakov (Gerasimov, 60), Minko, Leonidas (Pervushin, 79), Jankauskas.
 August 6, 1996 / Qualifying Round, First Leg / FC Dynamo Moscow - FC Jazz Pori 1-1 (Kobelev  - Laaksonen ) / Moscow, Dynamo Stadium / Attendance: 2,500
FC Dynamo Moscow: Smetanin (captain), Yakhimovich, Kovtun, Kolotovkin, Shtanyuk, Kobelev, S. Grishin, Tishkov, Kuznetsov, A. Grishin, Artyomov (R. Gusev, 33).
 August 6, 1996 / Qualifying Round, First Leg / NK Croatia Zagreb - FC Spartak Moscow 3-1 (Slišković  I. Cvitanović  Šarić  - Evseev ) / Zagreb, Maksimir Stadium / Attendance: 15,000
FC Spartak Moscow: Filimonov, Ananko, Gorlukovich (captain), Evseev, Mamedov (Duyun, 76), Kovalenko (Dzhubanov, 46), Melyoshin (Konovalov, 66), Alenichev, Titov, Kechinov, Tikhonov.
 August 6, 1996 / Qualifying Round, First Leg / HNK Hajduk Split - FC Torpedo Moscow 1-0  (Leonchenko ) / Split, Gradski stadion u Poljudu / Attendance: 20,000
FC Torpedo Moscow: Pchelnikov, Vostrosablin (captain), Makhmutov, Leonchenko (Savelyev, 72), Kornaukhov (Borodkin, 59), Krukovets (Burchenkov, 46), Nikolayev, Prokopenko, Kamnev, Avakov, Agashkov.

 August 20, 1996 / Qualifying Round, Return Leg / PFC CSKA Moscow - ÍA 4-1 (Movsisyan   Leonidas  Jankauskas  - Högnason ) / Moscow, Dynamo Stadium / Attendance: 3,000
PFC CSKA Moscow: Tyapushkin (Goncharov, 62), Samaroni, Khokhlov, Mashkarin, Gashkin, Pervushin, Semak (captain), Gerasimov (Movsisyan, 28), Minko (Tereškinas, 46), Leonidas, Jankauskas.
 August 20, 1996 / Qualifying Round, Return Leg / FC Jazz Pori - FC Dynamo Moscow 1-3 (Levo-Jokimaki  Rantanen  - Kobelev  Artyomov  ) / Pori, Porin Stadion / Attendance: 9,500
FC Dynamo Moscow: Smetanin (captain), Yakhimovich, Kovtun, Kolotovkin, Shtanyuk, Kobelev (Gushchin, 80), S. Grishin, Tishkov, R. Gusev, A. Grishin (Artyomov, 54), Tochilin (Nekrasov, 73).
 August 20, 1996 / Qualifying Round, Return Leg / FC Spartak Moscow - NK Croatia Zagreb 2-0 (Melyoshin  Alenichev ) / Moscow, Lokomotiv Stadium / Attendance: 18,000
FC Spartak Moscow: Filimonov, Duyun, Gorlukovich (captain), Evseev (Ananko, 73), Mamedov, Shirko, Melyoshin, Alenichev, Titov (Dzhubanov, 54), Kechinov, Tikhonov.
 August 20, 1996 / Qualifying Round, Return Leg / FC Torpedo-Luzhniki Moscow (renamed from FC Torpedo) - HNK Hajduk Split 2-0 (Kamoltsev  Vostrosablin ) / Moscow, Torpedo Stadium / Attendance: 6,800
FC Torpedo-Luzhniki Moscow: Pchelnikov, Vostrosablin (captain), Makhmutov, Leonchenko, Kornaukhov (Murashov, 39), Borodkin, Savelyev, Kamoltsev, Kamnev (Pazemov, 57), Avakov (Prokopenko, 76), Agashkov.

 September 10, 1996 / First Round, First Leg / PFC CSKA Moscow - Feyenoord 0-1 (van Wonderen ) / Moscow, Dynamo Stadium / Attendance: 6,000
PFC CSKA Moscow: Tyapushkin, Samaroni, Shutov, Mashkarin, Ivanov, Bushmanov, Semak (captain), Gerasimov, Minko, Leonidas (Pervushin, 62), Jankauskas.
 September 10, 1996 / First Round, First Leg / A.S. Roma - FC Dynamo Moscow 3-0 (Tommasi  Fonseca  ) / Rome, Stadio Olimpico / Attendance: 60,000
FC Dynamo Moscow: Smetanin (captain), Yakhimovich, Nekrasov, Kolotovkin, Shtanyuk, Kobelev, S. Grishin, Cheryshev, Kuznetsov (R. Gusev, 67), A. Grishin, Tochilin (Tishkov, 24).
 September 10, 1996 / First Round, First Leg / FC Spartak Moscow - Silkeborg IF 3-2 (Tikhonov    Kechinov  Nigmatullin  - Thygesen  Reese ) / Moscow, Lokomotiv Stadium / Attendance: 10,000
FC Spartak Moscow: Nigmatullin, Evseev, Gorlukovich, Tsymbalar (captain), Mamedov (Ananko, 82), Shirko (Duyun, 57), Golovskoy, Alenichev (Bezrodny, 78), Titov, Kechinov, Tikhonov.
 September 10, 1996 / First Round, First Leg / FC Torpedo-Luzhniki Moscow - FC Dinamo Tbilisi 0-1 (Jamarauli ) / Moscow, Torpedo Stadium / Attendance: 7,300
FC Torpedo-Luzhniki Moscow: Pchelnikov, Vostrosablin (captain), Makhmutov, Leonchenko, Kornaukhov, Nikolayev (Burchenkov, 46), Smertin (Savelyev, 51), Kamoltsev, Kamnev, Avakov, Agashkov (Prokopenko, 65).
 September 10, 1996 / First Round, First Leg / FC Alania Vladikavkaz - R.S.C. Anderlecht 2-1 (Yanovskiy  Shelia  - Pagayev ) / Vladikavkaz, Republican Spartak Stadium / Attendance: 37,000
FC Alania Vladikavkaz: Khapov, Kornienko (Revishvili, 59, Bitarov, 65), Timofeev, Shelia, Pagayev, Tetradze, Tedeyev (captain) (Sergeyev, 79), Yanovskiy, Agayev, Kanishchev, Suleymanov.

 September 24, 1996 / First Round, Return Leg / Feyenoord - PFC CSKA Moscow 1-1 (van Wonderen  - Minko ) / Rotterdam, De Kuip / Attendance: 35,000
PFC CSKA Moscow: Tyapushkin, Samaroni (Shutov, 75), Khokhlov, Mashkarin, Ivanov, Bushmanov, Semak (captain), Gashkin (Leonidas, 46), Minko, Jankauskas, Gerasimov.
 September 24, 1996 / First Round, Return Leg / FC Dynamo Moscow - A.S. Roma 1-3 (Kobelev  - Fonseca  Tommasi  Berretta ) / Moscow, Dynamo Stadium / Attendance: 5,000
FC Dynamo Moscow: Kleimyonov, Dyomin, Kovtun, Kolotovkin, Gushchin (R. Gusev, 46), Kobelev (captain) (Nekrasov, 46), S. Grishin, Cheryshev, Kuznetsov (Kutsenko, 46), A. Grishin, Teryokhin.
 September 24, 1996 / First Round, Return Leg / Silkeborg IF - FC Spartak Moscow 1-2 (Thygesen  - Tikhonov  Sønksen ) / Silkeborg, Silkeborg Stadion / Attendance: 10,000
FC Spartak Moscow: Filimonov, Ananko, Gorlukovich, Tsymbalar (captain), Mamedov, Shirko, Golovskoy, Alenichev (Dzhubanov, 55), Titov (Duyun, 70), Kechinov, Tikhonov.
 September 24, 1996 / First Round, Return Leg / FC Dinamo Tbilisi - FC Torpedo-Luzhniki Moscow 1-1 (Jamarauli  - Vostrosablin ) / Tbilisi, Boris Paichadze Stadium / Attendance: 65,000
FC Torpedo-Luzhniki Moscow: Pchelnikov, Vostrosablin (captain), Makhmutov, Leonchenko, Burchenkov (Pazemov, 70), Borodkin, Smertin (Nikolayev, 51), Kamoltsev (Prokopenko, 51), Kamnev, Savelyev, Agashkov.
 September 24, 1996 / R.S.C. Anderlecht - FC Alania Vladikavkaz 4-0 (Johnson   De Bilde  Zetterberg  ) / Brussels, Constant Vanden Stock Stadium / Attendance: 24,000
FC Alania Vladikavkaz: Khapov, Kornienko, Timofeev, Shelia, I. Dzhioyev (captain) (Suleymanov, 59), Tetradze, Tedeyev, Yanovskiy, Agayev (Datdeyev, 64), Kanishchev, Derkach (Sergeyev, 32).

 October 16, 1996 / Second Round, First Leg / Hamburger SV - FC Spartak Moscow 3-0 (Breitenreiter  Bäron  Kovačević ) / (Hamburg, Volksparkstadion) / Attendance: 17,347
FC Spartak Moscow: Nigmatullin, Ananko, Gorlukovich, Tsymbalar (captain), Mamedov, Evseev, Golovskoy (Titov, 27), Alenichev, Melyoshin (Shirko, 75), Kechinov (Bezrodny, 45), Tikhonov.

 October 29, 1996 / Second Round, Second Leg / FC Spartak Moscow - Hamburger SV 2-2 (Melyoshin  Tikhonov  - Schupp  Hartmann ) / Moscow, Lokomotiv Stadium / Attendance: 10,000
FC Spartak Moscow: Filimonov, Ananko, Gorlukovich (captain), Evseev (Dzhubanov, 35), Lipko (Golovskoy, 67), Duyun, Melyoshin (Bezrodny, 61), Alenichev, Titov, Shirko, Tikhonov.

1996 UEFA Intertoto Cup
Russian clubs participated in the Intertoto Cup for the first time. FC Rotor Volgograd, FC KAMAZ-Chally Naberezhnye Chelny and FC Uralmash Yekaterinburg all won their groups. Uralmash and KAMAZ lost in the semifinals and Rotor lost on away goals in the finals, not qualifying for the UEFA Cup.

 June 22, 1996 / Group 7, Day 1 / FC Ataka Minsk - FC Rotor Volgograd 0-4 (Abramov  Veretennikov   Orbu ) / City Stadium, Molodechno / Attendance: 2,500
FC Rotor Volgograd: Samorukov, Shmarko, Burlachenko (Potylchak, 46), Tishchenko, Zhabchenko, Borzenkov (Zernov, 46), Korniyets, Abramov, Veretennikov (captain), Yesipov, Orbu (Ilyushin, 83).
 June 22, 1996 / Group 8, Day 1 / FC KAMAZ-Chally Naberezhnye Chelny - ŁKS Łódź 3-0 (Klontsak  Yevdokimov  Babenko ) / Naberezhnye Chelny, KAMAZ stadium / Attendance: 5,000
FC KAMAZ-Chally Naberezhnye Chelny: Zakharchuk, Yugrin (Vinnikov, 55), Yefremov (Al-Shebat, 84), Klontsak, Aleksanenkov, Al-Shaqran, Baryshev (Prygunov, 72), Zubkov, Yevdokimov (captain), Babenko, Jishkariani.
 June 23, 1996 / Group 11, Day 1 / Hibernians F.C. - FC Uralmash Yekaterinburg 1-2 (Crawley  - Yamlikhanov  Khankeyev ) / Paola, Hibernians Ground / Attendance: 2,000
FC Uralmash Yekaterinburg: Shukhovtsev, Fedotov (captain), Ratnichkin, Bakunin, Bluzhin, Yamlikhanov, Bakhtin (Danilov, 46), Khankeyev (Vasikov, 89), Perednya (Kokarev, 70), Osinov, Mochulyak.

 June 29, 1996 / Group 8, Day 2 / FC Kaučuk Opava - FC KAMAZ-Chally Naberezhnye Chelny 1-2 (Rozhon  - Babenko  Klontsak  Aleksanenkov ) / Ostrava, Nová huť Stadium / Attendance: 3,000
FC KAMAZ-Chally Naberezhnye Chelny: Zakharchuk, Yugrin, Yefremov, Klontsak, Aleksanenkov, Al-Shaqran (Vinnikov, 87), Baryshev (Varlamov, 46), Zubkov, Yevdokimov (captain), Babenko, Jishkariani.

 July 6, 1996 / Group 7, Day 3 / FC Rotor Volgograd - FC Shakhtar Donetsk 4-1 (Zernov  Abramov  Veretennikov   - Kovalyov ) / Volgograd, Central Stadium / Attendance: 15,000
FC Rotor Volgograd: Samorukov, Shmarko, Zhabchenko (Zhunenko, 46), Tishchenko, Berketov, Borzenkov, Orbu (Korniyets, 46), Abramov, Veretennikov (captain), Yesipov, Zernov (Niederhaus, 59).
 July 6, 1996 / Group 11, Day 3 / FC Uralmash Yekaterinburg - PFC CSKA Sofia 2-1 (Litvinov   - Slavchev ) / Yekaterinburg, Central Stadium / Attendance: 4,000
FC Uralmash Yekaterinburg: Shukhovtsev, Fedotov (captain), Morozov, Litvinov, Reshetnikov, Yamlikhanov, Bakhtin, Danilov, Perednya (Vasikov, 87), Osinov, Mochulyak.

 July 13, 1996 / Group 8, Day 4 / FC KAMAZ-Chally Naberezhnye Chelny - PFC Spartak Varna 2-2 (Zayarnyi  Vinnikov  - Stanchev  Todorov ) / Naberezhnye Chelny, KAMAZ stadium / Attendance: 6,000
FC KAMAZ-Chally Naberezhnye Chelny: Zakharchuk, Varlamov, Yefremov, Klontsak, Yugrin (Tropanet, 46), Zayarnyi, Baryshev (Prygunov, 78), Zubkov, Yevdokimov (captain), Babenko, Jishkariani (Vinnikov, 60).
 July 13, 1996 / Group 11, Day 4 / RC Strasbourg - FC Uralmash Yekaterinburg 1-1 (Baticle  Bruno Rodriguez  - Litvinov ) / Strasbourg, Stade de la Meinau / Attendance: 8,000
FC Uralmash Yekaterinburg: Armishev, Fedotov (captain), Morozov, Litvinov, Bakunin, Yamlikhanov, Osinov, Danilov (Bakhtin, 46), Perednya, Romaschenko (Ratnichkin, 68), Mochulyak (Kokarev, 74).
 July 14, 1996 / Group 7, Day 4 / Antalyaspor - FC Rotor Volgograd 2-1 (Kona  Khuse  - Veretennikov  Berketov ) / Isparta, Isparta Atatürk Stadium / Attendance: 6,000
FC Rotor Volgograd: Samorukov, Shmarko, Zhunenko (Orbu, 60), Tishchenko, Berketov, Borzenkov, Korniyets, Niederhaus (Zhabchenko, 72), Veretennikov (captain), Yesipov, Abramov (Zernov, 55).

 July 20, 1996 / Group 7, Day 5 / FC Rotor Volgograd - FC Basel 3-2 (Niederhaus  Yesipov  Veretennikov  - Orlando  Giallanza ) / Volgograd, Central Stadium / Attendance: 20,000
FC Rotor Volgograd: Samorukov, Zhunenko, Burlachenko, Tishchenko, Zhabchenko (Zernov, 46), Borzenkov, Korniyets, Niederhaus (Ilyushin, 75), Veretennikov (captain), Yesipov, Orbu (Abramov, 68).
 July 20, 1996 / Group 8, Day 5 / TSV 1860 München - FC KAMAZ-Chally Naberezhnye Chelny 0-1 (Jishkariani ) / Munich, Grünwalder Stadion / Attendance: 20,600
FC KAMAZ-Chally Naberezhnye Chelny: Zakharchuk, Varlamov, Yefremov, Klontsak, Yugrin, Zayarnyi (Baryshev, 87), Tropanet, Zubkov, Yevdokimov (captain), Prygunov, Jishkariani.
 July 20, 1996 / Group 11, Day 5 / FC Uralmash Yekaterinburg - Kocaelispor 2-0 (Osinov  Kokarev ) / Yekaterinburg, Central Stadium / Attendance: 3,000
FC Uralmash Yekaterinburg: Armishev, Fedotov (captain), Ratnichkin, Litvinov (Bluzhin, 78), Bakunin, Yamlikhanov, Osinov, Danilov (Khankeyev, 46), Perednya, Romaschenko (Bakhtin, 73), Kokarev.

 July 27, 1996 / Semi-finals, First Leg / LASK Linz - FC Rotor Volgograd 2-2 (Westerthaler  Duspara  - Veretennikov   Yesipov ) / Linz, Linzer Stadion / Attendance: 5,000
FC Rotor Volgograd: Samorukov, Shmarko, Burlachenko, Tishchenko, Zernov (Abramov, 65), Borzenkov, Korniyets, Niederhaus (Zhabchenko, 82), Veretennikov (captain), Yesipov, Orbu (Zhunenko, 70).
 July 27, 1996 / Semi-finals, First Leg / FC KAMAZ-Chally Naberezhnye Chelny - Guingamp 2-0 (Babenko  Zayarnyi ) / Naberezhnye Chelny, KAMAZ stadium / Attendance: 8,000
FC KAMAZ-Chally Naberezhnye Chelny: Zakharchuk, Varlamov, Yefremov, Klontsak, Yugrin, Zayarnyi, Tropanet, Zubkov, Yevdokimov (captain) (Baryshev, 83), Babenko (Tikhonov, 79), Jishkariani (Prygunov, 64).
 July 27, 1996 / Semi-finals, First Leg / FC Uralmash Yekaterinburg - Silkeborg IF 1-2 (Bakhtin  - Bruun  Knudsen ) / Yekaterinburg, Central Stadium / Attendance: 5,500
FC Uralmash Yekaterinburg: Armishev, Fedotov (captain), Ratnichkin, Litvinov, Bakunin (Bluzhin, 63),  Yamlikhanov (Danilov, 71), Osinov, Khankeyev, Bakhtin, Romaschenko (Perednya, 51), Kokarev.

 July 31, 1996 / Semi-finals, Return Leg / FC Rotor Volgograd - LASK Linz 5-0 (Berketov  Veretennikov   Zernov  Abramov ) / Volgograd, Central Stadium / Attendance: 22,000
FC Rotor Volgograd: Samorukov (Karimov, 58), Zhabchenko (Zhunenko, 61), Burlachenko, Tishchenko, Berketov, Borzenkov, Korniyets, Abramov, Veretennikov (captain), Zernov (Gerashchenko, 68), Orbu.
 July 31, 1996 / Semi-finals, Return Leg / Guingamp - FC KAMAZ-Chally Naberezhnye Chelny 4-0  (Assadourian  Carnot  Horlaville  Moreira ) / Guingamp, Stade du Roudourou / Attendance: 4,615
FC KAMAZ-Chally Naberezhnye Chelny: Zakharchuk, Varlamov, Yefremov, Klontsak, Prygunov (Vinnikov, 105), Zayarnyi, Tropanet (Al-Shaqran, 33), Zubkov, Yevdokimov (captain), Babenko, Jishkariani (Baryshev, 86).
 July 31, 1996 / Semi-finals, Return Leg / Silkeborg IF - FC Uralmash Yekaterinburg 0-1 (Khankeyev  Romaschenko ) / Silkeborg, Silkeborg Stadion / Attendance: 12,000
FC Uralmash Yekaterinburg: Shukhovtsev, Fedotov (captain), Morozov, Litvinov, Bluzhin, Danilov (Vasikov, 65), Osinov (Bakunin, 81), Khankeyev, Perednya, Romaschenko, Kokarev (Ratnichkin, 70).

 August 6, 1996 / Finals, First Leg / FC Rotor Volgograd - Guingamp 2-1 (Zernov  Tishchenko  - Horlaville ) / Volgograd, Central Stadium / Attendance: 29,000
FC Rotor Volgograd: Samorukov, Shmarko, Abramov (Zhabchenko, 61), Tishchenko, Berketov, Borzenkov, Korniyets, Niederhaus (Gerashchenko, 84), Veretennikov (captain), Zernov (Ilyushin, 74), Orbu.

 August 20, 1996 / Finals, Return Leg / Guingamp - FC Rotor Volgograd 1-0 (Carnot ) / Guingamp, Stade du Roudourou / Attendance: 10,000
FC Rotor Volgograd: Samorukov, Shmarko, Gerashchenko (captain), Tishchenko (Burlachenko, 46), Berketov, Borzenkov, Korniyets (Zhunenko, 70), Niederhaus, Veretennikov, Yesipov, Zernov (Abramov, 64).

National team
Russia national football team participated in the UEFA Euro 1996, coming last in their group with 1 point and not qualifying for the quarterfinals. Oleg Romantsev was the manager up to and including the Euro, with Aleksandr Tarkhanov and Boris Ignatyev assisting. After the Euro Boris Ignatyev became the manager, with Aleksandr Tarkhanov and Yuri Syomin assisting.

 February 7, 1996 / Rothmans Cup / Malta - Russia 0-2 (Karpin  Kiriakov  / Ta' Qali, Ta' Qali National Stadium / Attendance: 2,000
Russia: Cherchesov, Mamedov, Nikiforov, Shalimov, Kovtun, Karpin, Onopko (captain), Tikhonov (Beschastnykh, 46), Mostovoi, Yuran, Kiriakov.

 February 9, 1996 / Rothmans Cup / Iceland - Russia 0-3 (Kanchelskis  Karpin  ) / Ta' Qali, Ta' Qali National Stadium / Attendance: 1,000
Russia: Kharine, Radimov, Nikiforov (Chugainov, 76), Tetradze, Kovtun (Kanchelskis, 10), Karpin, Onopko (captain) (Bushmanov, 46), Beschastnykh, Mostovoi (Simutenkov, 46), Dobrovolski (Alenichev, 76), Radchenko.

 February 11, 1996 / Rothmans Cup / Slovenia - Russia 1-3 (Gliha  - Simutenkov   Alenichev ) / Ta' Qali, Ta' Qali National Stadium / Attendance: 4,000
Russia: Cherchesov (Kharine, 46), Radimov (Mamedov, 70), Nikiforov (captain), Tetradze, Bushmanov (Chugainov, 78), Kanchelskis, Alenichev, Beschastnykh (Tikhonov, 78), Kechinov, Simutenkov, Radchenko.

 March 27, 1996 / Friendly / Ireland - Russia 0-2 (Keane  - Mostovoi  Kolyvanov ) / Dublin, Lansdowne Road / Attendance: 47,000
Russia: Cherchesov, Radimov (Tetradze, 46), Nikiforov, Tsymbalar (Radchenko, 46), Kovtun, Karpin, Onopko (captain), Kanchelskis, Kolyvanov (Shalimov, 70), Mostovoi, Kiriakov (Simutenkov, 66).

 April 24, 1996 / Friendly / Belgium - Russia 0-0 / Brussels, King Baudouin Stadium / Attendance: 16,000
Russia: Cherchesov (Kharine, 46), Kanchelskis, Nikiforov, Onopko (captain), Kovtun, Karpin, Radimov, Mostovoi, Beschastnykh, Kolyvanov (Simutenkov, 79), Kiriakov (Radchenko, 69).

 May 24, 1996 / Friendly / Qatar - Russia 2-5 (Mubarak Mustafa  Abdulaziz Hassan  - Kiriakov   Kanchelskis  Kolyvanov  Mostovoi  Nikiforov ) / Doha, Khalifa International Stadium / Attendance: 2,500
Russia: Kharine (Ovchinnikov, 85), Gorlukovich, Nikiforov, Tsymbalar (Dobrovolski, 46), Tetradze, Karpin (Shalimov, 59), Onopko (captain) (Bushmanov, 69), Kanchelskis, Kolyvanov (Yuran, 46), Mostovoi, Kiriakov.

 May 29, 1996 / Friendly / Russia - UAE 1-0 (Simutenkov ) / Moscow, Dynamo Stadium / Attendance: 5,500
Russia: Cherchesov, Radimov, Tetradze, Tsymbalar (Simutenkov, 68), Kovtun, Karpin, Onopko (captain), Kanchelskis (Dobrovolski, 46), Kolyvanov, Yanovskiy, Kiriakov.

 June 2, 1996 / Friendly / Russia - Poland 2-0 (Kovtun  Beschastnykh ) / Moscow, Dynamo Stadium / Attendance: 15,000
Russia: Kharine, Radimov (Shalimov, 86), Tetradze, Tsymbalar (Dobrovolski, 58), Kovtun, Karpin, Onopko (captain) (Nikiforov, 46), Kanchelskis, Kolyvanov (Simutenkov, 46), Yanovskiy, Kiriakov (Beschastnykh, 46).

 June 11, 1996 / UEFA Euro 1996, First Round, Group C / Italy - Russia 2-1 (Casiraghi   - Tsymbalar  / Liverpool, Anfield / Attendance: 35,120
Russia: Cherchesov, Tetradze, Bushmanov (Yanovskiy, 46), Onopko (captain), Kovtun, Kanchelskis, Karpin (Kiriakov, 63), Mostovoi, Tsymbalar (Dobrovolski, 71), Kolyvanov, Radimov.

 June 16, 1996 / UEFA Euro 1996, First Round, Group C / Russia - Germany 0-3 (Kovtun  - Sammer  Klinsmann  ) / Manchester, Old Trafford / Attendance: 50,760
Russia: Kharine, Tetradze, Nikiforov, Tsymbalar, Kovtun, Onopko (captain), Kanchelskis, Kolyvanov, Mostovoi, Radimov (Karpin, 46), Khokhlov (Simutenkov, 66).

 June 19, 1996 / UEFA Euro 1996, First Round, Group C / Russia - Czech Republic 3-3 (Mostovoi  Tetradze  Beschastnykh  - Suchopárek  Kuka  Šmicer ) / Liverpool, Anfield / Attendance: 21,128
Russia: Cherchesov, Tetradze, Nikiforov, Gorlukovich, Tsymbalar (Shalimov, 67), Karpin (captain), Yanovskiy, Radimov, Khokhlov, Kolyvanov (Beschastnykh, 46), Simutenkov (Mostovoi, 46).

 August 28, 1996 / Friendly / Russia - Brazil 2-2 (Nikiforov  Radimov  Onopko  - Donizete  Ronaldo  Cafu ) / Moscow, Dynamo Stadium / Attendance: 25,000
Russia: Cherchesov, Mamedov, Nikiforov, Tikhonov (Kharlachyov, 63), Ternavski, Tetradze, Onopko (captain), Kanchelskis, Veretennikov (Radimov, 15), Kolyvanov (Kechinov, 77), Radchenko (Beschastnykh, 66).

 September 1, 1996 / 1998 FIFA World Cup qualifier / Russia - Cyprus 4-0 (Nikiforov   Kolyvanov  Beschastnykh ) / Moscow, Dynamo Stadium / Attendance: 8,500
Russia: Cherchesov, Mamedov, Nikiforov, Onopko (captain), Ternavski, Kanchelskis, Radimov (Kharlachyov, 66), Tetradze, Beschastnykh, Kolyvanov (Tikhonov, 60), Radchenko (Kanishchev, 46).

 October 9, 1996 / 1998 FIFA World Cup qualifier / Israel - Russia 1-1 (G. Brumer  - Kolyvanov ) / Ramat Gan, Ramat Gan Stadium / Attendance: 48,000
Russia: Cherchesov, Minko, Nikiforov, Bushmanov (Radimov, 67), Karpin, Tetradze, Onopko (captain), Kanchelskis, Beschastnykh, Kolyvanov, Radchenko (Tikhonov, 46).

 November 10, 1996 / 1998 FIFA World Cup qualifier / Luxembourg - Russia 0-4 (Tikhonov  Kanchelskis  Beschastnykh  Karpin  Nikiforov ) / Luxembourg, Stade Josy Barthel / Attendance: 5,660
Russia: Cherchesov (Ovchinnikov, 75), Minko, Nikiforov, Tikhonov, Karpin, Tetradze, Onopko (captain), Kanchelskis, Beschastnykh (Radimov, 81), Kolyvanov, Mostovoi (Bushmanov, 46).

References
League and cup results
League top scorers 

 
Seasons in Russian football